Héctor Rubén Aguer (born 24 May 1943) is the Roman Catholic Archbishop emeritus of the Archdiocese of La Plata, province of Buenos Aires.

Early life and ordination
Aguer was born in Buenos Aires on 24 May 1943. He was a member of the parish Saint Mary Theresa Goretti; in the Maior Seminary he was a brilliant student; he received the degree of S.T. L. During his studies he worked to help Dr. Osvaldo D. Santagada (see Wikipedia) in the new ordination of the Theological Faculty Library; he helped also in the preparation of the famous number 14 of "Teologia" (the theological magazine of the Theological Faculty of the Catholic University of Argentina) dedicated to "Humanae Vitae" the Letter encyclical of Paul VI. He was ordained as a priest by cardinal Juan Carlos Aramburu, in Buenos Aires on 25 November 1972, at the age of 29. After the ordination and work in the parish Saint Pedro Gonzalez Telmo, he was appointed rector of the Maior Seminary of San Miguel (province of Buenos Aires). He was called several times by the General Secretary of the CELAM (Consejo Episcopal Latinoamericano) to give his advice on matters doctrinal and spiritual about seminaries in Latin America, (especially at the General meeting of rectors of seminaries in Quito, Ecuador, in 1984).

Bishop
He was appointed auxiliary bishop of the Archdiocese of Buenos Aires on 26 February 1992; and consecrated by 
Cardinal Antonio Quarracino on April 4, 1992. On 26 June 1998, he was appointed Archbishop Coadjutor of La Plata. He took possession of the see on 8 September 1998. He became the seventh Archbishop of La Plata on 12 June 2000. 

Pope Benedict XVI named his a member of the Pontifical Council for Justice and Peace on 24 February 2007, of the Pontifical Council for Culture on 17 January 2009, and of the Pontifical Commission for Latin America on 8 October 2009. Aguer also received a papal appointment to the 2012 Synod of Bishops on the New Evangelization.

Aguer is a member of the Pontifical Commission for the Cultural Goods of the Church; member of the International Council for Cathechese; member of the Pontifical Roman Academy Saint Thomas Aquinas; he is the Prior in Argentina of the Holy Sepulcher Order; the Chaplain of the Sovereign Order of the Knights of Malta. Aguer is the president of the Commission of Catholic Education in the Episcopal Conference of Argentina.

Pope Francis accepted his resignation on 2 June 2018.

Views
Aguer is considered a representative of the conservative sector of the Argentine Church. In homilies and episcopal documents, he has harshly criticized the proposed legalization of abortion in Argentina, some government-sponsored sex education plans and contraception campaigns, the secularization of culture, the idea of abolishing the requirement of clerical celibacy, the persecution of and discrimination against Christians, consumerism, "rock culture", etc.

References

 

21st-century Roman Catholic archbishops in Argentina
People from Buenos Aires
1943 births
Living people
Roman Catholic archbishops of La Plata in Argentina